Doosan Škoda Power, is a manufacturer and supplier of equipment for power stations, machine rooms especially equipped for steam turbines. Its headquarters are in Plzeň, Czech Republic. The portfolio includes steam turbines in the range of performances from 10 to 1200 MW in applications of gas, coal, cogeneration, nuclear and CSP power productions. Since 2009, it is part of the South Korean company Doosan. It has a significant position on the market, supplying its products to the USA, Japan etc.

Company products and services

Steam turbines 
Doosan Škoda Power designs and manufactures steam turbines from 5 MW to 1250 MW of output, including combined cycle and steam tail applications designed to increase the overall efficiency of simple gas turbines from 32-45% to 60% or above. A 48" rotor at the last stage and an axial output combine to enhance performance. Most of Doosan Škoda Power's waste-to-energy plant turbines use combined cycle technology.

".  For small power plants 5.- 8 MW. also available ."
 In 2012 Doosan Škoda Power won a contract to supply a 320 MW two-cylinder steam turbine for the new Hatay Erzin combined cycle gas power plant in Turkey.
 Also in 2012, Doosan Škoda Power began production on a steam turbine and auxiliaries for Poland's largest combined cycle power plant in Stalowa Wola, expected to begin operation in 2015. As well as supplying the steam turbine and generator, Doosan Škoda will supply the surface condenser, four district water heaters, bypass valves and other auxiliaries.

Doosan Škoda Power designs and builds back-pressure and condensing steam turbines for district heating with regulated steam consumption. A rotating partition regulates the pressure, allowing consumption to be located in the low-pressure part of the turbine, optimising each unit for water heating at relatively low temperatures. Closed regulation valves, where only a minimum amount of steam flows into the condenser for cooling the final turbine levels, offer flexibility through periods of varying energy and heat consumption, and permit a high heat consumption rate. These turbines are particularly suitable in countries with established heat ducting systems, including the Czech Republic, Poland, Denmark, Finland and Russia.
 Doosan Škoda Power is currently modernising the steam turbine and generator at Salmisaari heating plant in Finland. It will supply a new low-pressure turbine, complete inner part of the high-pressure turbine, valves, generator and spare parts as required.
 At Finland's Hanasaari heating plant, Doosan Škoda Power is currently modernising the existing Škoda back-pressure steam turbine, adding 3D blading rotors and new diaphragms, inner casings and turning gear. Full project management services are being provided.

Doosan Škoda Power develops high-temperature steam turbines for coal-fired power plants that meet strict emissions targets by operating at increasingly high temperatures (currently around 600–620 °C) using ultra-supercritical steam technology. Its nuclear power plant-optimised turbines handle enormous steam flow parameters and ensure resilience to water drop erosion at high temperatures. Turbines operate up to 1250 MW, ensuring that the pressure and expansion of individual components are maintained within normal parameters.

The company has so far carried out installations totalling over 55,000 MW in 60 countries around the world.

Heat exchangers 
Doosan Škoda Power manufactures heat exchangers, including the HEI standard and the ASME Code and ADMerkblatt standards for pressure equipment. Components are made from titanium and specialised alloys that can withstand the high temperatures required.

The company produces high and low pressure water heating systems, radial or axial steam output surface condensers and retrofits for previously-installed Škoda heat exchangers.

Related equipment and services 
In addition to turbines and heat exchangers, Doosan Škoda Power provides turbine islands and complete turbine halls. It also modernises and retrofits both Škoda and third-party OEM turbines.
 Doosan Škoda Power is currently modernising turbine condensers at the Mochovce plant in Slovakia, replacing brass components with titanium components and upgrading the water chambers to increase the operating lifetime of the steam generators.
 The company is currently retrofitting flow parts of the high-pressure components of the original Škoda 220 MW turbines in the Dukovany nuclear power plant, Czech Republic. The project includes connecting new parts to existing equipment, commissioning, testing, warranty, handover and training.
 In 2007 Doosan Škoda Power retrofitted high pressure components in two 1000 MW turbines at the Temelin nuclear power plant, Czech Republic, supporting safe, reliable and economical operation until at least 2042.

History

References 

Engine manufacturers of the Czech Republic
Electrical generation engine manufacturers
Steam turbine manufacturers
2009 mergers and acquisitions
Plzeň